The Spears Group is a group of geologic formations exposed in and around the northeast Mogollon-Datil volcanic field of southwestern New Mexico. It has a radiometric age of 33 to 39 million years, corresponding to the Eocene to Oligocene epochs.

Description
The group is composed primarily of volcaniclastic beds, deposited in alluvial fans or braided streams, with minor basaltic andesite to dacite lava flows. It contains some lacustrine delta deposits at its base. The group grades below into the Baca Formation and interfingers with lava flows and ash flow sheets of the Mogollon Group and Datil Group.

K-Ar and fission track dating suggest an age of 33 to 39 million years.

The Dog Springs Formation shows striking sedimentary structure indicating that the debris flow beds making up most of the formation slumped over distance scales of miles on the underlying Baca Formation beds. In some locations, clastic dikes derived from the Baca Formation penetrate the overlying Dog Springs Formation.

Formations
The group is divided into numerous formations. In descending stratigraphic order, these are:
 South Crosby Peak Formation
 Rincon Windmill Formation
 Chavez Canyon Formation
 Dog Springs Formation
 Rubio Peak Formation
 Palm Park Formation
 Pueblo Creek Formation
 Bell Top Formation
 Rock Springs Formation

In addition, a number of informal units have been described within the group.

History of investigation
The name was first used by W.H. Tonking in 1957 for the lowest beds of the Datil Volcanics (as then designated). G.R. Osburn and C.E. Chapin raised the unit to formation rank within the Datil Group and divided into members separated by ash flow sheets. In 1994, Steven M. Cather and coinvestigators raised the Spears Formation to group rank and its members to formation rank, redefining the group as all volcaniclastic apron sediments of the Mogollon-Datil volcanic field. They also described several informal formations within the group.

References 

Geologic groups of New Mexico
Paleogene formations of New Mexico